Lepidium quitense is a species of flowering plant in the family Brassicaceae. It occurs only in Ecuador. Its natural habitat is subtropical or tropical dry shrubland. It is threatened by habitat loss.

References

quitense
Flora of Ecuador
Vulnerable plants
Plants described in 1854
Taxonomy articles created by Polbot
Taxa named by Nikolai Turczaninow